Henri Hollanders (9 November 1922 – 24 June 1995) was a Belgian basketball player. He competed in the men's tournament at the 1948 Summer Olympics.

References

1922 births
1995 deaths
Belgian men's basketball players
Olympic basketball players of Belgium
Basketball players at the 1948 Summer Olympics
Sportspeople from Brussels